Bryconella pallidifrons is a species of characin found in the Amazon River basin of Brazil and Peru.  It is the only member of its genus.

B. pallidifrons is found in a freshwater environment at a pelagic depth range. This species is native to a tropical climate. 
It reaches a maximum length of about 2.3 cm or 0.9 in males or about 3.5 cm or 1.37 in for females. B. pallidifrons swims in small schools.

References

Notes
 

Characidae
Monotypic fish genera
Fish of South America
Fish of Brazil
Fish of Peru
Taxa named by Henry Weed Fowler
Fish described in 1946